Thierry Brusseau (born July 22, 1964 in Marvejols, Lozère) was a track and field athlete from France, who mainly competed in the men's 3.000 metres steeplechase during his career. His personal best was 8:22.22, achieved in 1991. He competed in the men's 3000 metres steeplechase at the 1992 Summer Olympics.

Achievements
All results regarding 3.000 metres steeplechase, unless stated otherwise

References

External links
 IAAF Profile

1964 births
Living people
French male long-distance runners
French male steeplechase runners
Olympic athletes of France
Athletes (track and field) at the 1992 Summer Olympics
Universiade medalists in athletics (track and field)
Sportspeople from Lozère
Mediterranean Games bronze medalists for France
Mediterranean Games medalists in athletics
Athletes (track and field) at the 1993 Mediterranean Games
Universiade bronze medalists for France
Medalists at the 1989 Summer Universiade
20th-century French people